Ladelle Andrews Hamilton Jr. (born April 8, 1950) is a former American football wide receiver who played three seasons in the National Football League (NFL) with the Kansas City Chiefs and New Orleans Saints. He was drafted by the Chiefs in the fourth round of the 1972 NFL Draft. He played college football at Louisiana State University.

Early years
Hamilton played high school football at Ruston High School in Ruston, Louisiana. While at Ruston, he played receiver while his cousin, Bert Jones, played quarterback.

College career
Hamilton played for the LSU Tigers from 1968 to 1971. He played for LSU's freshman team in 1968. Hamilton also played with Bert Jones at LSU. He caught 109 passes for 2,141 yards and 18 touchdowns during his college career. He also rushed for 65 yards and 5 touchdowns. Hamilton set LSU career records for receptions, receiving yards, and receiving touchdowns. He tied an Orange Bowl record with 9 receptions in the 1971 Orange Bowl. He also tied an LSU record for touchdown catches in a game when he caught three in a victory against Notre Dame in 1971.

Professional career

Kansas City Chiefs
Hamilton was selected by the Kansas City Chiefs with the 97th pick in the 1972 NFL Draft and subsequently signed with the team. He missed the entire 1972 season due to a shoulder injury. He made his NFL debut on November 4, 1973, against the San Diego Chargers. He had missed the earlier parts of the season due to injuries. He played in five games for the Chiefs in 1973, catching 2 passes for 35 yards. He played in 10 games in 1974, catching 2 passes for 25  yards. He was released by the Chiefs on September 16, 1975.

New Orleans Saints
Hamilton played in 9 games for the New Orleans Saints during the 1975 season, catching 12 passes for 210 yards.

Personal Testimony in Tiger Stadium 
In 1970, Hamilton spoke at the Billy Graham Crusade in Detroit's Tiger Stadium. He gave witness to his Christian faith, saying: "One thing gives me more satisfaction [than winning] and that's knowing Jesus Christ is in my heart." He was a member of the Fellowship of Christian Athletes.

References

External links
Just Sports Stats
College stats

Living people
1950 births
Players of American football from Louisiana
American football wide receivers
LSU Tigers football players
Kansas City Chiefs players
New Orleans Saints players
Sportspeople from Ruston, Louisiana